The 2008–09 Minnesota Wild season began October 11, 2008. It was the Wild's ninth season in the National Hockey League (NHL).

Pre-season
At the conclusion of the Pre-season, the Wild finished with a 5-2 record.

Regular season
The Wild were the most disciplined team in the League during the regular season, with just 291 power-play opportunities against. They also allowed the fewest power-play goals, with just 36.

Divisional standings

Conference standings

Schedule and results

Playoffs
The Minnesota Wild failed to qualify for the 2009 NHL Playoffs. after qualifying in 2006-07 and 2007–08

Player statistics

Skaters

Goaltenders

†Denotes player spent time with another team before joining Wild. Stats reflect time with Wild only.
‡Traded mid-season. Stats reflect time with Wild only.

Awards and records

Records

Milestones

Transactions

Trades

Free agents

Draft picks
Minnesota's picks at the 2008 NHL Entry Draft in Ottawa, Ontario.

See also
2008–09 NHL season

Farm teams

References

Minnesota Wild seasons
M
M